Berta Pereira Majó (born June 10, 1958) is a Uruguayan percussionist, dancer, and actor who specializes in Afro-Uruguayan themes. In 1995, she founded the group Berta Pereira y las Comadres, which focuses on Afro-Uruguayan music and folklore. The band is well known for their candombe style of music and their participation in Memoria para armar, a musical performance and dramatic reading of testimonies by women imprisoned under the Uruguayan military dictatorship in the 1970's and 1980's.

Biography
Born in Montevideo, Pereira grew up in a musical family, with both of her parents playing the guitar. Her sister, a guitar teacher, taught her to play when she was only five. She went on to study the Uruguayan harp with Carlos Vega while taking lessons in ballet and contemporary dance. At the time, during the era of the Uruguayan dictatorship, the College of Fine Arts  was closed, and Pereira took various classes in the workshop of Zina Fernández: ceramics, drawing, painting, batik and goldsmithing. Later, she studied English, French, and Portuguese, and worked for a time as a translator and interpreter.

While living abroad in France and Panama, Pereira participated in various musical groups. In Panama, she acted in the street theater group Oveja Negra ("Black Sheep") directed by Ileana Solís Palma. She later formed her own band named "Acertijo" together with Ventura Dríguez, Franz Gutiérrez and Marie Sanjur.

In 1990, after she returned to Uruguay and had begun to devote more time to her compositions, she met her husband to be, Pollo Píriz, whose music appealed to her. After their son Lorenzo was born in 1995, she formed the group "Las Comadres".

This opening consists of a group of women percussionists with large drums singing, yelling, and applauding while acting out the washing of clothing (white cloth) in a very afro-centric style. Pereira, who enters the stage carrying a bundle of laundry on her head, states "Traje un montón de ropa para lavar. Tengo tanta historia para lavar." ("I brought a ton of laundry to wash. I have so much history to wash.") Throughout the rest of the performance, Pereira and the Comadres' candombe music is interspersed with four women reading from the testimonies of the former prisoners and their families about life during the dictatorship.

As a musician, Pereira has played sessions with Uruguayan and latino musicians such as Lobo Lagarde, Elbio Rodríguez Barilari, grupo Pataquín, Diego Avendaño and Bardo Khan. As a musician and actress, she has worked on various interdisciplinary collaborations with  Afro-Cuban, Afro-Peruvian, and folkloric themes and has participated various times in the Uruguayan carnival parade. In 2005 she starred in a new adaptation of Ubu Rey (Ubu Roi by Alfred Jarrý (1873-1907)) with the group Polizonteatro directed by Enrique Permuy. She collaborated with poet  on a CD and live poetry performance Tamudando in 2009.

Pereira has released a number of CDs including "Comerse una manzana", "Bicho de luz", "Comadres", "Ambrosio", "Pedrito Malasartes" and "Gracias". Pereira and Píriz have been nominated for the Uruguayan  for their CD's "Ambrosio" and "Gracias". According to Pereira, some of her most important musical influences have been Elis Regina, Maria Joao, Lenine, Richard Bona and Hugo Fattoruso.

Discography 

 Comadres (1995)
 Comerse una manzana (1996) 
 La gran red del cielo (with Pollo Píriz) (1999) 
Bicho de luz (2001)
Ambrosio (with Pollo Píriz) (2008)
Tamudando (with Luis Bravo) (2009)
 Gracias (with Pollo Píriz) (2015)

References

External links 

 Memoria para armar - original collections of testimonies by women who were ex-political prisoners of the Uruguayan dictatorship (Spanish)
Pollo Píriz y Berta Pereira, Un hilo de luz - interview in Spanish about CD "Bicho de Luz"
 Berta Pereira and Pollo Píriz - Band Facebook Page

1958 births
Uruguayan percussionists
Uruguayan female dancers
Musicians from Montevideo
Living people
Women percussionists
20th-century women musicians
21st-century women musicians
20th-century dancers
21st-century dancers
Uruguayan actresses